The Dongfeng EV400 or DFAC Captain EV400 is an electric light, commercial logistics van designed and produced by the Chinese automaker Dongfeng Automobile Company since 2018.

Overview

The Dongfeng EV400 has three range variants, with an electric range of 185km, 220km and 360km respectively. The top speed in 90km/hr for models produced in Xiangyang, Hubei and 95km/hr for models produced in Wuhan, Hubei.

The Dongfeng EV400 was built on a frame chassis with a permanent magnet synchronous electric motor codenamed 	
TZ310XS-LKM0503 supplied by LVKON positioned over the rear axle, with the output of which reaching 	
110kW, and 500N·m of torque. The battery of the EV400 is a 86.02kWh battery supplied by Evebattery with a density of 136.74Wh/kg. The EV400 is a 2- to 3-seater vehicle.

Sunlong Guangxi Nanning Yibian NEV
A rebadged variant produced by Sunlong Guangxi Nanning Yibian NEV (申龙 广西一卞新能源) of Sunlong was briefly available. Models are only offered for rent and lease services as of January 2021.

References

External links
EV400 on 360che

EV400
Vans
Electric vans
Vehicles introduced in 2018
2010s cars
Rear-wheel-drive vehicles